Jenkins, Jordan and Timmons is an album by saxophonists John Jenkins and Clifford Jordan and pianist Bobby Timmons recorded in 1957 and released on the New Jazz label.

Reception

Scott Yanow of Allmusic reviewed the album calling it "an excellent effort".

Track listing 
All compositions by John Jenkins except as indicated
 "Cliff's Edge" (Clifford Jordan) - 6:29    
 "Tenderly" (Walter Gross, Jack Lawrence) - 7:03    
 "Princess" - 6:15    
 "Soft Talk" (Julian Priester) - 10:32    
 "Blue Jay" - 7:07

Personnel 
John Jenkins - alto saxophone
Clifford Jordan - tenor saxophone
Bobby Timmons - piano
Wilbur Ware - bass
Dannie Richmond - drums

Production
Bob Weinstock - supervisor
Rudy Van Gelder - engineer

References 

John Jenkins (jazz musician) albums
Clifford Jordan albums
Bobby Timmons albums
1957 albums
New Jazz Records albums
Albums produced by Bob Weinstock
Albums recorded at Van Gelder Studio